Nasrollah Pejmanfar is an Iranian Shi'a cleric and conservative politician who represents Mashhad and Kalat electoral district in the Parliament of Iran since 2012.

He is member of the Front of Islamic Revolution Stability.

References

1964 births
Living people
Members of the 9th Islamic Consultative Assembly
Members of the 10th Islamic Consultative Assembly
Deputies of Mashhad and Kalat
Front of Islamic Revolution Stability politicians